Mary Wallace (born 13 June 1959) is a former Irish Fianna Fáil politician. She served as a Teachta Dála (TD) for the Meath and Meath East constituencies from 1989 to 2011.

Early life
Wallace was born in County Dublin in 1959. She was educated at the Loreto Convents in Balbriggan and North Great Georges Street, Dublin and the College of Commerce, Rathmines where she received a diploma in Hospital and Health Services Administration. Following this she went on to work as a Personnel Executive in Blanchardstown Hospital.

Political career
Wallace first held political office in 1982 when she was elected to Meath County Council. She served on that authority until 1997. In 1987 she was elected to the 18th Seanad Éireann on the Administrative Panel, having failed to get elected to Dáil Éireann at the 1987 general election. She was successful at the 1989 general election and was elected for the Meath constituency. She retained her seat at each subsequent election, moving to the new Meath East constituency for the 2007 general election.

Wallace remained on the backbenches until 1995 when she became Opposition Spokesperson for people with disabilities and carers. When Fianna Fáil came to office in 1997 under Bertie Ahern, she was appointed as Department of Justice, Equality and Law Reform with responsibility for equality and disabilities. The Disability Bill she was piloting through the Dáil was withdrawn and she was not re-appointed after the 2002 general election.

In February 2006 Wallace rejoined the junior ministerial team as Minister of State at the Department of Agriculture and Food with special responsibility for Forestry. Her promotion caused some surprise as Seán Haughey had been the front-runner for promotion, while Wallace's name had not even been mentioned. She was reappointed to the same responsibility the following year on the formation of a new government.

In May 2008, after Brian Cowen succeeded Ahern as Taoiseach, she was appointed as Minister of State at the Department of Health and Children with special responsibility for Health Promotion and Food Safety. She lost her position as Minister of State in a reshuffle on 21 April 2009 when Cowen reduced the number of Ministers of State from 20 to 15.

She retired from politics at the 2011 general election.

References

1959 births
Living people
Alumni of Dublin Institute of Technology
Fianna Fáil TDs
Local councillors in County Meath
Members of the 18th Seanad
20th-century women members of Seanad Éireann
Members of the 26th Dáil
Members of the 27th Dáil
Members of the 28th Dáil
Members of the 29th Dáil
Members of the 30th Dáil
20th-century women Teachtaí Dála
21st-century women Teachtaí Dála
Ministers of State of the 28th Dáil
Ministers of State of the 29th Dáil
Ministers of State of the 30th Dáil
Politicians from County Dublin
Fianna Fáil senators
Women ministers of state of the Republic of Ireland